Spring Silkworms is a 1933 silent film from China. It was directed by Cheng Bugao and was adapted by Cai Chusheng and Xia Yan from the novella of the same name by Chinese author Mao Dun.

The film stars Xiao Ying, Yan Yuexian, Gong Jianong, Gao Qianping and Ai Xia and was produced by the Mingxing Film Company.

Today the film is considered one of the earliest films of the leftist movement in 1930s Shanghai.

Plot 
The film tells the story of a family of poor silk farmers in Zhejiang province, who suffer hardship and deprivation when their crop of silkworm cocoons die off. The film criticizes not only the harsh market conditions that have forced the family into poverty, but the family's own superstitions and selfishness.

Old Tong Bao is the patriarch of a silkworm-rearing family in Zhejiang.  He refuses to buy foreign breeds of silkworms for his coming crop.  The market conditions are harsh and despite the efforts his family put in rearing the silkworms, the ensuing cocoons are unable to fetch a price in the market.  The film also features a subplot where a married woman, Lotus, is ostracized by Tong Bao's family for being a supposed jinx.

External links
 Spring Silkworms (1933) with English subtitles, on the Chinese Film Classics website

Spring Silkworms at the Chinese Movie Database
Spring Silkworms at the UCSD Chinese Cinema Web-based Learning Center

Films based on short fiction
Chinese silent films
1933 films
1933 drama films
Films set in Zhejiang
Films based on Chinese novels
Chinese drama films
Chinese black-and-white films
Silent drama films
Chinese-language films